Viyand-e Kalkhvoran (also Romanized as Vīyand-e Kalkhvorān, Vīānd-e Kalkhūrān, Vīyand-e Kalkhowrān, and Vīyand-e Kalkhūrān) is a village in the Central District of Sareyn County, Ardabil Province, Iran. At the 2006 census, its population was 184 in 49 families.

References 

Towns and villages in Sareyn County